Myles Standish Monument State Reservation is a state-owned historic preserve and public recreation area in Duxbury, Massachusetts. The focus of the state park is a 116-foot granite shaft topped by a statue of Captain Myles Standish. Standish was military leader of Plymouth Colony. The park is managed by the Massachusetts Department of Conservation and Recreation.

History
A dedication and cornerstone-laying ceremony attended by 10,000 persons took place on October 7, 1872. The monument was not completed until 1898. The monument was built on Captain's Hill, the highest point, 200 feet above sea level, on what was once Standish's farm. The monument rises 116 feet from its foundation to a small viewing parapet that offers panoramic views over the original Plymouth Colony. The 14-foot statue that surmounts the tower has Standish gazing eastward across Massachusetts Bay and holding the colony's charter. The Commonwealth of Massachusetts has owned the monument and grounds since 1920. The monument was refurbished in 1988.

Activities and amenities
The tower's 125 steps can be climbed when open, yielding views from the top of 19th-century lighthouses, Duxbury Beach, Plymouth Harbor, and the Blue Hills to the northwest. The park offers walking trails, picnic tables, and seasonal interpretive programs.

Nearby is Myles Standish Burial Ground, the final resting place for the Captain, with a second, smaller monument built over his gravesite.

References

External links

Myles Standish Monument State Reservation Department of Conservation and Recreation

Plymouth, Massachusetts
State parks of Massachusetts
Massachusetts natural resources
Duxbury, Massachusetts
Monuments and memorials in Massachusetts
Parks in Plymouth County, Massachusetts
1898 sculptures
Granite sculptures in Massachusetts
1898 establishments in Massachusetts
Statues in Massachusetts
Sculptures of men in Massachusetts
Monuments and memorials to the Pilgrims